Terry Winter (November 1, 1942 – December 10, 1998) was a Canadian televangelist, who hosted The Terry Winter Show on Vision TV.

Unlike some other Christian televangelists, Winter took an intellectual approach to faith. He taught that Christianity is a simple faith, not a simplistic one, and that if one decides to become a Christian, one does not need to leave one's mind at the door.

Born in New Westminster, British Columbia, Winter was raised in Nanaimo, British Columbia. Winter died of a brain aneurysm in Vancouver, British Columbia at age 56 in 1998. His television program continued to air in repeats for a few months, ending permanently in early 1999.

External links
 Popular evangelist dies at 56 ChristianWeek
 Who was Terry Winter? from David Spencer's Media Spin
 Terry Winter dead at 56 The evangelical community loses a voice by Evangelical Fellowship of Canada; W. Ward Gasgue and the Vancouver Sun
 Tributes to Terry Winter came from far and wide by Geoff Tunnicliffe in CanadianChristianity.com

1942 births
1998 deaths
Canadian Christians
Canadian television evangelists
People from New Westminster